The Hope Party Australia was a minor Australian political party active between 1997 and 2004. It was founded in 1997 in Melbourne by Tim Petherbridge and registered at both federal and state level in 1999. The party contested several elections but had little success. It was deregistered in 2006.

References

Defunct political parties in Australia
Political parties established in 1997
Political parties disestablished in 2006
1997 establishments in Australia
2006 disestablishments in Australia